Kaflarnia  is a settlement in the administrative district of Gmina Nowa Brzeźnica, within Pajęczno County, Łódź Voivodeship, in central Poland.

The settlement has a population of seven.

References

Kaflarnia